The 2004 Women's Six Nations Championship, also known as the 2004 RBS Women's 6 Nations due to the tournament's sponsorship by the Royal Bank of Scotland, was the third series of the rugby union Women's Six Nations Championship and was won by , who achieved the Grand Slam.

Table

Results

See also
Women's Six Nations Championship
Women's international rugby union

References

External links
The official RBS Six Nations Site

2004
2003–04 in Irish rugby union
2003–04 in English rugby union
2003–04 in Welsh rugby union
2003–04 in Scottish rugby union
2003–04 in French rugby union
2003–04 in European women's rugby union
rugby union
rugby union
rugby union
rugby union
2003–04 in Spanish rugby union
International women's rugby union competitions hosted by Spain
Women
rugby union
rugby union
Women's Six Nations
Women's Six Nations